Richard Thorpe (born Rollo Smolt Thorpe; February 24, 1896 – May 1, 1991) was an American film director best known for his long career at Metro-Goldwyn-Mayer.

Biography
Born Rollo Smolt Thorpe in Hutchinson, Kansas, Richard Thorpe began his entertainment career performing in vaudeville and onstage. In 1921 he began in motion pictures as an actor and directed his first silent film in 1923. He went on to direct more than one hundred and eighty films. He worked frequently at the Poverty Row studio Chesterfield Pictures during the 1930s. The first full-length motion picture he directed for MGM was Last of the Pagans (1935) starring Ray Mala. 

At MGM, he teamed up with producer Pandro S. Berman in the 1950s, with whom he made several films, including Ivanhoe (1952), The Prisoner of Zenda (1952), Knights of the Round Table (1953), All the Brothers Were Valiant (1953) and The Adventures of Quentin Durward (1955).

After directing The Last Challenge in 1967, he retired from the film industry.

His two favorite films were Night Must Fall (1937) and Two Girls and a Sailor (1944).

Wizard of Oz
Thorpe is also known as the original director of The Wizard of Oz. He was fired after two weeks of shooting because it was felt that his scenes did not have the right air of fantasy about them. Thorpe notoriously gave Judy Garland a blonde wig and cutesy "baby-doll" makeup that made her look like a girl in her late teens rather than an innocent Kansas farm girl of about 13. Both makeup and wig were discarded at the suggestion of George Cukor, who was brought in temporarily. Stills from Thorpe's work on the film survive today. Further, it is understood that bits of his filmed footage of Toto escaping from the Wicked Witch's castle are featured in the film, albeit uncredited.

For his contribution to the motion picture industry, Thorpe has a star on the Hollywood Walk of Fame at 6101 Hollywood Blvd. In 2003 a Golden Palm Star on the Palm Springs Walk of Stars in Palm Springs, California was dedicated to him and his son Jerry.

He died in Palm Springs, California on May 1, 1991.

Selected filmography

As director

 Rough Ridin' (1924)
 Battling Buddy (1924)
 Bringin' Home the Bacon (1924)
 Thundering Romance (1924)
 Rarin' to Go (1924)
 The Desert Demon (1925)
 Double Action Daniels (1925)
 A Streak of Luck (1925)
 Galloping On (1925)
 The Saddle Cyclone (1925)
 Gold and Grit (1925)
 On the Go (1925)
 Fast Fightin' (1925)
 Double Daring (1926)
 The Bandit Buster (1926)
 The Bonanza Buckaroo (1926)
 College Days (1926)
 The Dangerous Dub (1926)
 The Twin Triggers (1926)
 Deuce High (1926)
 The Fighting Cheat (1926)
 Twisted Triggers (1926)
 Rawhide (1926)
 Between Dangers (1927)
 Tearin' Into Trouble (1927)
 Skedaddle Gold (1927)
 The Cyclone Cowboy (1927)
 Pals in Peril (1927)
 White Pebbles (1927)
 The Interferin' Gent (1927)
 The Ridin' Rowdy (1927)
 The Desert of the Lost (1927)
 Roarin' Broncs (1927)
 The First Night (1927)
 The Meddlin' Stranger (1927)
 Ride 'em High (1927)
 The Galloping Gobs (1927)
 The Obligin' Buckaroo (1927)
 Soda Water Cowboy (1927)
 The Cowboy Cavalier (1928)
 The Ballyhoo Buster (1928)
 The Flyin' Buckaroo (1928)
 Saddle Mates (1928)
 The Valley of Hunted Men (1928)
 Desperate Courage (1928)
 Vultures of the Sea (1928)
 The Vanishing West (1928)
 The Fatal Warning (1929)
Border Romance (1929)
 The King of the Kongo (1929)
 The Utah Kid (1930)
 The Dude Wrangler (1930)
 Under Montana Skies (1930)
 Wings of Adventure (1930)
 The Lady from Nowhere (1931)
 The Lawless Woman (1931)
 Forgotten Women (1931)
 Slightly Married (1932)
 Murder at Dawn (1932)
 The Secrets of Wu Sin (1932)
 Women Won't Tell (1932)
 Cross-Examination (1932)
 Forbidden Company (1932)
 The King Murder (1932)
 Escapade (1932)
 Forgotten (1933)
 Notorious but Nice (1933)
 Love Is Dangerous (1933)
 Green Eyes (1934)
 Secret of the Chateau (1934)
The Quitter (1934)
 Cheating Cheaters (1934) with Fay Wray
 Last of the Pagans (1935)
 Strange Wives (1935)
 Tarzan Escapes (1936) with Johnny Weissmuller and Maureen O'Sullivan
 Night Must Fall (1937) with Robert Montgomery and Rosalind Russell
 Dangerous Number (1937) with Ann Sothern and Robert Young
 Man-Proof (1938) with Myrna Loy, Franchot Tone, Rosalind Russell, and Walter Pidgeon
 The Toy Wife (1938) with Luise Rainer and Melvyn Douglas
 Love Is a Headache (1938) with Franchot Tone
 The Crowd Roars (1938) with Robert Taylor, Edward Arnold, Frank Morgan, and Maureen O'Sullivan
 The Adventures of Huckleberry Finn (1939) with Mickey Rooney, Walter Connolly, and William Frawley
 20 Mule Team (1940) with Wallace Beery
 Wyoming (1940) with Wallace Beery
 The Earl of Chicago (1940) with Robert Montgomery
 Barnacle Bill (1941) with Wallace Beery
 The Bad Man (1941) with Wallace Beery, Lionel Barrymore, Laraine Day, and Ronald Reagan
 Tarzan's New York Adventure (1942) with Johnny Weissmuller and Maureen O'Sullivan
 White Cargo (1942) with Hedy Lamarr as Tondelayo
 Above Suspicion (1943) with Joan Crawford and Fred MacMurray
 Two Girls and a Sailor (1944) with Van Johnson and June Allyson
 The Thin Man Goes Home (1945) with William Powell and Myrna Loy
 Thrill of a Romance (1945) with Esther Williams
 Her Highness and the Bellboy (1945) with Hedy Lamarr and Robert Walker
 Fiesta (1947) with Esther Williams and Ricardo Montalbán
 This Time for Keeps (1947) with Esther Williams and Jimmy Durante
 On an Island with You (1948) with Esther Williams, Peter Lawford, and Jimmy Durante
 A Date with Judy (1948) with Wallace Beery, Jane Powell, and Elizabeth Taylor
 Malaya (1949) with Spencer Tracy and James Stewart
 Big Jack (1949) with Wallace Beery, Richard Conte, Marjorie Main, and Edward Arnold
 Challenge to Lassie (1949) with Donald Crisp and Alan Napier
 Black Hand (1950) with Gene Kelly
 Three Little Words (1950) with Fred Astaire and Red Skelton
 The Great Caruso (1951) with Mario Lanza and Ann Blyth
 The Unknown Man (1951) with Walter Pidgeon
 Vengeance Valley (1951) with Burt Lancaster
 Carbine Williams (1952) with James Stewart
 Ivanhoe (1952) with Robert Taylor, Elizabeth Taylor, and Joan Fontaine
 The Prisoner of Zenda (1952) with Stewart Granger, Deborah Kerr, and James Mason
 The Girl Who Had Everything (1953) with Elizabeth Taylor, Fernando Lamas, and William Powell
 Knights of the Round Table (1953) with Robert Taylor and Ava Gardner
 All the Brothers Were Valiant (1953) with Robert Taylor and Stewart Granger
 Athena (1954) with Jane Powell and Debbie Reynolds
 The Student Prince (1954), based on the famous operetta, with Ann Blyth, Edmund Purdom, and the singing voice of Mario Lanza.
 The Adventures of Quentin Durward (1955) with Robert Taylor and Robert Morley
 Tip on a Dead Jockey (1957) with Robert Taylor and Dorothy Malone
 Ten Thousand Bedrooms (1957) with Dean Martin (Martin's first non-Martin and Lewis movie)
 Jailhouse Rock (1957) with Elvis Presley
 Killers of Kilimanjaro (1959) with Robert Taylor and Anthony Newley
 The House of the Seven Hawks (1959) with Robert Taylor
 The Honeymoon Machine (1961) with Steve McQueen
 The Tartars (Italian, 1961) with Orson Welles and Victor Mature
 The Horizontal Lieutenant (1962) with Jim Hutton and Paula Prentiss
 Follow the Boys (1963) with Paula Prentiss
 Fun in Acapulco (1963) with Elvis Presley and Ursula Andress
 The Golden Head (1964) with George Sanders and Buddy Hackett
 The Truth About Spring (1964) with Hayley Mills
 That Funny Feeling (1965) with Sandra Dee, Bobby Darin, and Donald O'Connor
 The Last Challenge (1967) with Glenn Ford and Angie Dickinson
 The Scorpio Letters (1967, TV film) with Alex Cord and Shirley Eaton

References

External links
 
 Richard Thorpe at TCMDB

1896 births
1991 deaths
Male actors from Kansas
American male silent film actors
American male stage actors
People from Hutchinson, Kansas
Vaudeville performers
20th-century American male actors
Film directors from Kansas